Circus (stylized CiRcuS) is the second studio album released by Filipino alternative rock group Eraserheads in 1994. Hits from Circus are "Alapaap", "Sembreak", "Kailan" (originally a musical number from the play Manhid by Auraeus Solito), "Magasin", and "With a Smile". It is also the last album of the band with singles released in the vinyl record format.

The album was reissued by Sony-BMG Entertainment in 2006. This is the first album that uses an inverted letter E, a notable trademark of the band. The album cover was created by visual artist Mark Justiniani. The original artwork is now with the artist’s son.

"Wating" is the theme song for the 1994 Filipino movie of the same name, starring Richard Gomez and Carmina Villaroel. It does not appear on the original cassette release. The last part of the song features Carmina Villaroel on vocals.

The album was re-released as a 25th anniversary remastered edition on November 15, 2019.

Commercial performance
This album sold more than 200,000 copies as of 2012, which was certified seven times platinum by Philippine Association of the Record Industry and this also remained as their second best selling studio album of all time throughout their efforts as a band.

Track listing

Personnel
Adapted from the liner notes.

Eraserheads
 Ely Buendia – vocals , acoustic guitar, tambourine
 Marcus Adoro – electric guitar, vocals 
 Buddy Zabala – bass, keyboards
 Raymund Marasigan – drums, vocals 

Additional musicians
 Carmina Villarroel – vocals 

Production
 Robin Rivera – production, mixing 
 Lito Palco – mixing , engineering
 Dindo Aldecoa – engineering
 Buddy Medina – executive production
 Rudy Tee – executive production
 Vic Valenciano – A&R

Design
 Mark Justiniani – cover painting
 Mario Joson – art direction, design
 Grace Torres – art direction, design

References

External links
Allmusic Review
schizo-archives.com

1994 albums
Eraserheads albums